Heinz Schmidt (20 April 1920 – 5 September 1943) was a German Luftwaffe military aviator during World War II, a fighter ace credited with 173 enemy aircraft shot down in 712 combat missions. All of his victories were claimed over the Eastern Front.

Born in Bad Homburg, Schmidt volunteered for military service in the Luftwaffe of Nazi Germany in 1938. Following flight training, he was posted to Jagdgeschwader 52 (JG 52—52nd Fighter Wing) in 1940. He flew his first combat missions in the Battle of Britain and claimed his first aerial victory in the opening phase of Operation Barbarossa, the German invasion of the Soviet Union. Following his 51st aerial victory he was awarded the Knight's Cross of the Iron Cross on 23 August 1942 and the Knight's Cross of the Iron Cross with Oak Leaves on 16 September 1942 after 102 victories.

In July 1943, Schmidt was appointed Staffelkapitän (squadron leader) of the 6. Staffel (6th squadron) of JG 52. Schmidt was posted as missing in action after aerial combat near Markor on 5 September 1943. It is believed that he was mistakenly shot down by Hungarian fighters operating in the same area. He was promoted to Hauptmann (captain) posthumously.

Early life and career
Schmidt was born on 20 April 1920 in Bad Homburg, the son of metal worker Adolf Schmidt. His friends called him Johnny. From Easter 1930, he attended the Realgymnasium—a secondary school built on the mid-level Realschule to achieve the Abitur (university entry qualification)—in Bad Homburg and graduated in March 1938. Aged 13, Schmidt joined the Hitlerjugend (HJ—Hitler Youth) where he attained the rank of Kameradschaftsführer (Comrade Unit Leader) and learned to fly glider aircraft.

After Schmidt completed his compulsory Reichsarbeitsdienst (RAD—Reich Labor Service) with RAD department 6/225 in Heubach/Schlüchtern, he joined the military service of the Luftwaffe with 3./Flieger-Ersatz-Abteilung 14 (3rd Company of Flier Replacement Unit 14) in Detmold on 10 November 1938. There he completed his recruit training and on 12 April 1939 began his pilot training. From 9 October 1939 to 15 May 1940, Schmidt attended the Flugzeugführerschule A/B (flight school for the pilot license) at Plauen, Saxony. There he was promoted to Gefreiter (lance corporal) on 1 December 1939. Upon completion, Schmidt attended the Jagdfliegerschule 3 (3rd Fighter Pilot School). He began his training on 17 May 1940 with 2. Staffel (2nd squadron). After completing these training courses, he was assigned to the 2. Staffel of the Ergänzungs-Jagdgruppe Merseburg on 17 July 1940 for final fighter-pilot preparation.

World War II
World War II in Europe had begun on 1 September 1939, when German forces invaded Poland. On 12 August 1940, Schmidt was transferred to 4. Staffel (4th squadron) of Jagdgeschwader 52 (JG 52—52nd Fighter Wing), commanded by Oberleutnant (First Lieutenant) Johannes Steinhoff. His II. Gruppe of JG 52 was, at that time, engaged in the Battle of Britain and was commanded by Hauptmann (Captain) Erich Woitke. During 12–18 August, Schmidt flew his first combat missions against England and then from 19 August to 23 September, defense of the Reich missions over the German Bight. For a short time (13–26 September), Schmidt served as a pilot in 5./JG 52 (5th squadron) before returning to 4. Staffel on 27 September. There, he was promoted to Obergefreiter (senior lance corporal) on 1 October and received the Iron Cross 2nd Class on 22 October and the Iron Cross 1st Class on 9 November.

In early November, JG 52 was withdrawn from combat operations and relocated to Germany to recuperate and replenish their aircraft. There, Schmidt was promoted to Unteroffizier (subordinate officer or lance sergeant) on 1 December. The Geschwader returned to active service where Schmidt flew further defense of the Reich missions over the Netherlands from 27 December 1940 to 8 February 1941. He then again flew missions against England from 9–24 February, and again defensive missions, now over Belgium, from 25 February to 6 June. On 1 April, Schmidt was promoted to Feldwebel (sergeant) and became a Fähnrich (officer candidate).

Operation Barbarossa
On 9 June 1941, II. Gruppe of JG 52 was recalled from Western Europe in preparation for Operation Barbarossa, the German invasion of the Soviet Union. 4. Staffel flew to an airfield at Suwałki, close to the German-Soviet demarcation line. For the invasion, II. Gruppe of JG 52 was subordinated to the Stab (headquarters unit) of Jagdgeschwader 27 (JG 27—27th Fighter Wing). The Geschwader was part of the  VIII. Fliegerkorps commanded by Generaloberst Wolfram Freiherr von Richthofen which supported the northern wing of Army Group Centre.
Schmidt claimed his first victory on 26 June, an Ilyushin DB-3 bomber shot down near Varėna.

On 12 August, Schmidt crash landed his Messerschmitt Bf 109 F-2 near Saklinja, approximately  into enemy territory, and spent six days evading capture until he was able to get back to the friendly territory, and his unit. He received the Front Flying Clasp of the Luftwaffe in Gold on 22 August. Schmidt claimed his fifth aerial victory on 25 August, on his 116th combat mission of the war. The next day, he claimed a Polikarpov I-17 fighter and on 27 August, he was promoted to Oberfeldwebel (warrant officer second class). On 2 September, II. Gruppe moved to Lyuban, staying there until end-September. From there, the Gruppe flew missions against Shlisselburg, Mga and Leningrad. II. Gruppes subordination to JG 27 ended on 20 October and they came under the command of the Stab of JG 52. Schmidt claimed his last two aerial victories of 1941 in late November, a DB-3, followed by a Lavochkin-Gorbunov-Gudkov LaGG-3 fighter, also referred to as a I-301 by the Germans.

Eastern Front
On 22 December, JG 52 was withdrawn from combat operations for a period of recuperation and replenishment and was moved to Jesau near Königsberg, arriving on 16 January 1942. Following the relocation, Schmidt was posted to the infantry on 19 January. This assignment ended on 27 February and he was then sent to Germany (28 February – 7 May 1942). During this period, Schmidt was commissioned, attaining the rank of Leutnant (second lieutenant). The infantry Kampfgruppe to which Schmidt had been assigned, consisted predominantly of ground personnel and a few pilots of II./JG 52.

At Jesau, the Gruppe began upgrading their aircraft to the Bf 109 F-4. On 14 April, II. Gruppe was ordered to Pilsen, where they finished the conversion. The unit then moved to Wien-Schwechat on 24 April before flying to Zürichtal, present-day Solote Pole, a village near the urban settlement Kirovske in the Crimea. There II. Gruppe participated in Operation Trappenjagd, a German counterattack during the Battle of the Kerch Peninsula, launched on 8 May.

On the second day of the operation, Schmidt claimed his 16th victory, a Mikoyan-Gurevich MiG-1 fighter. By 4 July his score increased to 45 victories  and he was presentated the Honour Goblet of the Luftwaffe  two days later. On 1 July, he temporarily led 5. Staffel of JG 52 after its commander, Oberleutnant Siegfried Simsch had been wounded in combat on 29 May. Initially, Leutnant Waldemar Semelka had let the Staffel until his transfer on 30 June. By the end of July, his tally of aerial victories had reached 64. Schmidt was promoted to Oberleutnant (first lieutenant) on 1 August. As JG 52 continued to fight in the air battles in the advance toward Stalingrad, Schmidt was awarded the German Cross in Gold on 20 August. Three days later, he was also honored with the Knight's Cross of the Iron Cross.

Stalingrad
The Battle of Stalingrad began on 23 August when German forces began breaking out from the bridgehead across the Don River. The next day, Schmidt became an "ace-in-a-day" when he shot down seven LaGG-3s in combat over the outskirts of Stalingrad, taking his total to 82 aerial victories. On 9 September, Schmidt shot down two Ilyushin Il-2 ground attack aircraft, taking his number of aerial victories to 100. He was the 21st Luftwaffe pilot to achieve the century-mark and he was awarded the Knight's Cross of the Iron Cross with Oak Leaves on 16 September in Germany for 102 aerial victories claimed. He was the 124th member of the German armed forces to be so honored.

Returning in late November, he was assigned to 6. Staffel, near Stalingrad, after the Soviets had launched Operation Uranus that encircled Axis forces fighting in and near the city. As the Germans were retreating back to Taganrog and Rostov, he scored his 125th victory on 7 January 1943. Eight days later, his Bf 109 G-2 (Werknummer 14556—factory number) fighter crashed after suffering engine problems. He was shot down again behind Russian lines in mid-February, returning to friendly territory after a two-day trek across the frozen Sea of Azov minus one fur-lined flying boot and with a smashed shoulder and dislocated right arm. Schmidt then spent five days at the field hospital before he was transferred to the Luftwaffen-Lazarett (military hospital) in Berlin, and was then sent to his hometown Reserve-Lazarett (reserve military hospital) in Bad Homburg.

Kuban, Kharkov and death

Following his convalescence, Schmidt returned to the Eastern Front and was briefly assigned to 4. Staffel before he was transferred to 6. Staffel on 23 July. At the time of his return, II. Gruppe was based at Mariupol, and fighting in the Kuban bridgehead as part of the Battle of the Caucasus. On 27 July, Schmidt was appointed Staffelkapitän (squadron leader) of 6. Staffel, replacing Oberleutnant Helmut Lipfert who had temporarily held this position following the death of Oberleutnant Karl Ritzenberger on 24 May. The next day, he claimed his 131st victory, a Bell P-39 Airacobra fighter. The military situation of Army Group South resulted in splitting the forces of II. Gruppe. All of 6. Staffel and parts of 5. This task force was put under the command of Oberleutnant Gerhard Barkhorn. Two days later, Soviet forced launched the Belgorod-Kharkov Offensive Operation resulting in another redeployment of JG 52. Now based at the Kharkov-Rogan airfield, southeast of Kharkov, Schmidt became an "ace-in-a-day" again. That day, he was credited with five aerial victories, an Il-2, three Yakovlev Yak-1 fighters and a Lavochkin La-5 fighter. On 11 August, the task force was ordered from Charkow-Rogan to Lebedyn. Here it provided fighter protection over the areas of operation between the 8th Army and 4th Panzer Army. This transfer detached the task force from the command of I. Gruppe, to which it had been assigned. Barkhorn, who at the time also served as acting Gruppenkommandeur (group commander), stayed with I. Gruppe. Command of the task force subsequently went to Schmidt. He achieved his 150th aerial victory the next day after claiming a pair of Yak-1s.

On 1 September, II. On 5 September, Schmidt claimed his 172nd and 173rd victories, a La-5 and an Il-2. These were his final claims before he was posted as missing in action after aerial combat near Markor, near Kotelva, that day. His Bf 109 G-6 aircraft 'Yellow 7' (Werknummer 15903—factory number) was possibly shot down in error by Hungarian fighters operating in the same area. At the time of his death, he was the highest-scoring fighter pilot of II. Gruppe. Authors Prien, Stemmer, Rodeike and Bock state that the circumstances about his death remain unanswered. They further speculate that the story about him having been shot down by friendly fighters could be a myth, created to uphold the illusion that he was killed undefeated by the enemy. Schmidt was posthumously promoted to Hauptmann. Command of 6. Staffel again went to Lipfert.

Summary of career

Aerial victory claims
According to US historian David T. Zabecki, Schmidt was credited with 173 aerial victories. Obermaier also lists Schmidt with 173 aerial victories claimed in over 700 combat missions. Mathews and Foreman, authors of Luftwaffe Aces — Biographies and Victory Claims, researched the German Federal Archives and found records for 173 aerial victories, all of which claimed on the Eastern Front.

Victory claims were logged to a map-reference (PQ = Planquadrat), for example "PQ 49241". These sectors were then subdivided into 36 smaller units to give a location area 3 × 4 km in size.

Awards
 Flugzeugführerabzeichen (Pilots Badge)
 Iron Cross (1939)
 2nd Class (22 October 1940)
 1st Class (9 November 1940)
 Front Flying Clasp of the Luftwaffe
 in Gold (22 August 1941)
 in Gold with pennant (12 December 1942)
 Honour Goblet of the Luftwaffe on 6 July 1942 as Leutnant and pilot
 German Cross in Gold on 13 August 1942 as Leutnant in the 4./Jagdgeschwader 52
 Medaille "Winterschlacht Im Osten 1941/42" (30 August 1942)
 Knight's Cross of the Iron Cross with Oak Leaves
 Knight's Cross on 23 August 1942 as Leutnant and pilot in the 6./Jagdgeschwader 52
 124th Oak Leaves on 16 September 1942 as Leutnant and pilot in the 6./Jagdgeschwader 52

Dates of rank

Notes

References

Citations

Bibliography

 
 
 
 
 
 
 
 
 
 
 
 
 
 
 
 
 
 
 
 

1920 births
1943 deaths
People from Bad Homburg vor der Höhe
People from Hesse-Nassau
Luftwaffe pilots
German World War II flying aces
Recipients of the Gold German Cross
Recipients of the Knight's Cross of the Iron Cross with Oak Leaves
Luftwaffe personnel killed in World War II
Missing in action of World War II
Aviators killed by being shot down
Reich Labour Service members
Aerial disappearances of military personnel in action
Hitler Youth members
Military personnel from Hesse